Summerbeatz was a 2010 concert tour held in Australia featuring Flo Rida, Jay Sean, Ciara, Ja Rule and Travie McCoy with special guests Stan Walker, Giulietta (who won the support act slot through a competition) and DJ Nino Brown.

Background 
The original line up of acts touring for Summerbeatz included Flo Rida, Jay Sean, Soulja Boy, Travie McCoy, Stan Walker and DJ Nino Brown. However Soulja Boy had later decided to pull out of the tour and was replaced by Ja Rule. In October 2010 it was announced that Ciara and Akon would be joining the line up of acts. However Akon did not tour in Melbourne. Promoter Dwayne Cross released a statement saying "It's with great regret that we announce that Akon will not be performing in Melbourne on the Summerbeatz 2010 Tour. This is due to restrictions put on us by the Melbourne venue Rod Laver Arena." Jay Sean did not make an appearance at the Brisbane and Sydney shows due to a death in his family.

Tour dates

References 

2010 concert tours
Ciara concert tours